Francis Lawley may refer to:
 Francis Charles Lawley, British journalist and politician 
 Sir Francis Lawley, 2nd Baronet, English courtier and politician
 Sir Francis Lawley, 7th Baronet, English politician